Emley Association Football Club is a football club based in Emley, West Yorkshire, England.

History
The original Emley club founded in 1903 had been members of the Yorkshire League and Northern Counties East League, before winning promotion to the Northern Premier League in 1989. In 2000, new ground grading regulations introduced by the Northern Premier League forced Emley to relocate to Belle Vue in Wakefield, although the reserves continued to play at the Welfare Ground. In 2002 the club was renamed Wakefield & Emley, and when the reserve team was disbanded in 2005, supporters of the original club decided to establish a new club based in Emley under the name A.F.C. Emley. The following year Wakefield & Emley was renamed Wakefield, and remained in the Northern Premier League until disbanding in 2014.
 
The new Emley club joined Division One of the West Yorkshire League for the 2005–06 season. After finishing third in their first season, they were promoted to Division One of the Northern Counties East League. In 2015–16 they finished fourth in Division One, qualifying for the promotion play-offs. After beating Penistone Church 1–0 in the semi-finals, they lost 4–3 on penalties to Bottesford Town in the final after a 1–1 draw. Striker Ashley Flynn finished the season with 73 goals, a league record. In 2016–17 the club finished third, missing out on automatic promotion on goal difference; they went on to lose 3–1 to Penistone Church in the play-off semi-finals.

In March 2019 it was announced that the club would be renamed Emley A.F.C. from the 2019–20 season, five years after the original club was dissolved. The club were transferred to Division One North of the North West Counties League for the 2019–20 season. They were fourth in Division One North with games in hand on two clubs above them by mid-March 2020, but the season was the abandoned due to the COVID-19 pandemic. They were subsequently transferred back to Division One of the Northern Counties East League for the 2020–21 season and were top of the league when the season was abandoned in February 2021. In May 2021 the club were promoted to the Premier Division based on their results in the two abandoned seasons.

Season-by-season record

Ground

The club plays at the Welfare Ground in Emley. It has a capacity of 2,000, of which 1,000 is covered and 330 seated. The ground is shared with the local cricket club and has three permanent stands; the Warburton End, which consists of a small terrace and uncovered hard standing behind one goal; the Main stand, which has a small uncovered terrace section near the dugouts, as well as housing the clubs offices, changing rooms and sports bar; and the Richard Hirst Stand (also known as The Shed), a low covered terrace behind the other goal. During the football season, a fence is erected along the cricket field side.

Records
Best FA Cup performance: Preliminary round 2007–08, 2010–11, 2013–14, 2014–15, 2015–16, 2021–22
Best FA Vase performance: Fourth round, 2012–13

See also
Emley A.F.C. players
Emley A.F.C. managers

References

External links
Official website

 
Football clubs in England
Football clubs in West Yorkshire
Sports clubs in Huddersfield
Sport in Kirklees
Association football clubs established in 2005
2005 establishments in England
Sheffield & Hallamshire County FA members
West Yorkshire Association Football League
Northern Counties East Football League
North West Counties Football League clubs
Denby Dale